Festigal is an annual Israeli song and dance musical show for children. Festigal is held every year at Hanukkah time, during the school vacation. It began as a song contest but the format gradually changed to include performances by well-known Israeli singers and actors. Each year's event is built around a particular theme or story.

History
The first Festigal took place in the city of Haifa in 1981 and was the brainchild of impresario Miki Peled (later to be joined by his son, Yaron Peled). Since then, it has been held in venues nationwide. It is among the largest events during Hanukkah. For example, in 2006, about NIS 18 million NIS were allocated for the concerts.

Theme songs
From 2002 until 2015, a theme song based on a popular tune was used, such as "Holding Out for a Hero" in 2005.

List of theme songs

 2002: "The Ketchup Song" – שיר הקטשופ
 2003: "Around the World" (Israeli Song) – סביב כל העולם
 2004: "Dragostea din tei" – נומה נומה היי
 2005: "Holding Out for a Hero" – גיבור על העולם
 2006: "The Final Countdown" – פסטיגל פנטזיה
 2007: "Major Tom (Coming Home)" – זמן זה כוח
 2008: "Can You Feel It" – תפוס ת'פסטיגל
 2009: "I'm So Excited" – תנו ברגליים
 2010: "The Rhythm of the Night" – לילה מטורף בפסטיגל
 2011: "Mr. Saxobeat" – פסטיגלi
 2012: "Livin' la Vida Loca" – ספיי פסטיגל
 2013: "Euphoria" – אקס פסטיגל
 2014: "When the Rain Begins to Fall" – זמן משחקי הפסטיגל
 2015: "Heroes" – עכשיו זה היי סקול פסטיגל

Themes
From 1984, Festigal has had a different theme each year. For example, in 2010, the theme was the story of two kids lost in a museum at night with the exhibits coming to life and showing pieces of history (based on the movie Night at the Museum). In 2015, the show had a high school theme loosely based on the Fame franchise and the TV show Glee.

List of themes

 1984: Channel 1
 1985: Robots
 1986: Radio broadcasting
 1987: Saving the Garden from Demolition
 1988: The Light Kingdom
 1989: Family
 1990: Fight of the Festigal
 1991: Hanny'le and the Saturday Dress
 1992: To Be a Star
 1993: Father and Daughter at Festigal
 1994: Television
 1995: Animals
 1996: Circus – מורידים את הכוכבים מהשמיים
 1997: Amusement park – כי העולם שייך לילדים
 1998: Dreams – הבחירה של הילדים
 1999: Millennium – הפסטיגל של המילניום הבא
 2000: Toys – צעצוע של פסטיגל
 2001: Telenovela – פלאנובלה של פסטיגל
 2002: Cinematography – פסטיגל מהסרטים
 2003: World Tour – פסטיגל סובב עולם
 2004: Fairy tales – לא יאומן כי פסטיגל
 2005: Superheroes – פסטיגל גיבורי על
 2006: Fantasy – פסטיגל גיבורי הממלכה האבודה
 2007: Time travel – פסטיגל על הזמן
 2008: Underwater – תפוס ת'פסטיגל – הרפתקה במצולות
 2009: Kung fu – קונג פו פסטיגל
 2010: History – לילה מטורף בפסטיגל
 2011: Cyberspace – איי פסטיגל
 2012: Spying  – ספיי פסטיגל
 2013: The Four Elements – אקס פסטיגל
 2014: The Hunger Games – משחקי הפסטיגל
 2015 and 2016: High school - היי סקול פסטיגל / היי סקול פסטיגל 2: הגמר הגדול
 2017: Urban legend – סטורי של פסטיגל
 2018: Dance – FreeStyle# פסטיגל
 2019: Cyberspace – פסטיגל Play
 2020: 40th Anniversary – פסטיגל My
 2021: Angels – פסטיגל Sky High

See also
 Dance in Israel
 Music of Israel
 Culture of Israel

References

Music festivals in Israel
Recurring events established in 1981
Singing competitions
1981 establishments in Israel
Children's music festivals
Culture in Haifa
Hanukkah
Music competitions in Israel